The 2012 Superstars Series Mugello round was the fourth round of the 2012 Superstars Series season. It took place on 3 June at the Mugello Circuit.

Andrea Larini won the first race, starting from sixth position, driving a Mercedes C63 AMG, and Francesco Sini gained the second one, driving a Chevrolet Lumina CR8.

Classification

Qualifying

Race 1

Race 2

Standings after the event

International Series standings

Italian Championship standings

Teams' Championship standings

 Note: Only the top five positions are included for both sets of drivers' standings.

References

2012 in Italian motorsport
Superstars Series seasons